Behar is the 32nd weekly parshah or portion in the annual Jewish cycle of Torah reading.

Behar may also refer to: 


Places
 Bihar, a state in India
 Cooch Behar, a town in West Bengal, India and the former capital of Koch Bihar
 Cooch Behar district, a district in West Bengal, India

People
 Behar (surname)

Other
 Behar (magazine), Bosnian political journal published from 1900 to 1911
 Fischer, Behar, Chen, Well, Orion & Co., one of the largest law firms in Israel

See also
 Bejar (disambiguation)
 Bexar (disambiguation)
 Bahar (disambiguation)
 Bezoar (disambiguation)